The Reşadiye Marşı was the imperial anthem of the Ottoman Empire from 1909 to 1918. Upon the commencement of Sultan Mehmed V Reşad's reign in 1909, a competition was declared to compose a personal march for the new sultan. The contest was won by Italo Selvelli, who was of Italian descent, as were nearly all the other composers of personal marches for previous sultans. Like the previous sultan's march, this anthem also had lyrics, although they seem to have been lost to history.

References 

Anthems